WTRJ-FM (91.7 MHz) is an FM radio station licensed to Orange Park, Florida.  The station is currently owned by Delmarva Educational Association and airs a Christian talk and teaching radio format using the moniker "The Truth."  It is simulcast on 91.9 WAYL in St. Augustine, Florida, and 91.3 WATY in Folkston, Georgia.  WTRJ covers the City of Jacksonville and its adjacent communities, while WAYL covers the southern part of the Jacksonville metropolitan area and WATY covers the northern section. Programming is also broadcast on WAYL's two translator stations in Jacksonville (94.3 MHz) and Atlantic Beach, Florida (103.7 MHz).

The Truth carries a schedule of national religious leaders, including David Jeremiah, Charles Stanley, John MacArthur, Jim Daly and Chuck Swindoll.  Hosts may seek donations during their programs.  Some programming is supplied by the Salem Radio Network.

WTRJ's transmitter is off Hogan Road in Jacksonville.  The studios and offices are also in Jacksonville, on Bonneval Road.

History
The station signed on the air as WNLE on Halloween, October 31, 1986.  It was owned by the Nassau Baptist College and was originally licensed to Fernandina Beach, Florida.  On September 21, 2006, WNLE changed its call sign to WJBC-FM, and again on May 4, 2010, to WTRJ-FM.

Programming on WTRJ-FM originally was heard at 88.1 WCRJ.  On May 1, 2011, it moved to 91.7 and 91.9 to better cover the Jacksonville radio market.  88.1 WCRJ is now airing Contemporary Christian music from "The Joy FM."  In the early 2010s, WTRJ-FM switched its city of license from Fernandina Beach to Orange Park, although the transmitter and studios remain in Jacksonville.

References

External links

Radio stations established in 1984
1984 establishments in Florida
TRJ-FM